See also Ektachrome for full details of Kodak E-series processes.

The E-2 process and E-3 process are outdated processes for developing Ektachrome reversal photographic film.  The two processes are very similar, and differ depending on the film.  Kodak sold kits that could process either kind of film.

Films are processed at 75°F (23.9°C) with a tolerance of only 0.5°F.  The steps are:

First developer.  This is a conventional black-and-white developer, and develops as a negative.
Stop bath
Hardener

After this, the film is removed from the tank and thoroughly exposed with a bright light (Photoflood).  Replace in tank, though the lid was no longer required.

Colour developer.  This develops the now exposed silver bromide, and at the same time activated the dye couplers
Stop bath
Bleach, to remove all the developed silver
Clear, to remove pink stains left by the colour developer
Stop bath

Films designed for E-2 and E-3 are prone to fading because of the instability of the color dyes. The processes were phased out in  1974 in favor of E-4 (which was introduced in 1966), and two years later E-6 was introduced which remains in use to this day.

External links 
Kodak specifications for hand mixing of chemistry

Processing of older Ektachrome films including Process E-3:
 Film Rescue USA and Canada
 Rocky Mountain USA

Photographic film processes